Vimianzo is a municipality of northwestern Spain in the province of A Coruña in the autonomous community of Galicia. It forms part of the comarca of Terra de Soneira.

The city is bounded on the north by the municipalities of Camariñas, Laxe and the Atlantic Ocean on a small ledge. To the east it borders the municipality of Zas, south to the town Dumbría and a dam that separates the Fervenza Township Mazaricos, and west by the town of Muxía.

Main sights 

 Dolmen of Pedra da Arca
 Vimianzo castle

References

External links 
 Official website

Municipalities in the Province of A Coruña